The Oka Castle, now in ruins, is in Taketa, Ōita Prefecture, Japan.

History 

Oka Castle has an extensive history. Sited on a mountaintop, it was originally built in 1185, for Minamoto no Yoshitsune.

Shiga Sadatomo took control in 1332 and made many repairs and improvements. The castle was ruled by Shiga's descendants until 1586.

At that point, it was taken over by Nakagawa Hideshige (in 1594) and more improvements were made, including an expansion. A main keep was added along with a palace. The Sankai turret (三階櫓), the castle's de facto Tenshu, collapsed in an earthquake, in 1769. Many of the buildings were destroyed by fire, in 1771, which had originated in the castle town. The Nakagawa ruled the castle until the Meiji Restoration.

Oka castle was decommissioned in 1871, and in 1874 all the buildings were dismantled.

Current site 

The current site features some of the extensive stone walls which run for several kilometres. There is a statue dedicated to composer Rentaro Taki, whose famous song Kōjō no Tsuki was inspired by the castle ruins, on site.

Literature

References

External links

Former castles in Japan
1185 establishments in Asia
1871 disestablishments in Japan
12th-century establishments in Japan
Castles in Ōita Prefecture